William Orton may refer to:
 Bill Orton (1948–2009), U.S. Representative from Utah
 William Orton (businessman), president of Western Union

See also
Orton (surname)
William Orton Williams, Confederate officer during the American Civil War